The 2014 O'Byrne Cup was a Gaelic football competition played by the teams of Leinster GAA: eleven county teams (all except Kilkenny) and five third-level colleges' teams competed. Kildare were the winners for the third time in four years.

Format
The sixteen teams are drawn into four groups of four, each team playing all the other teams in its group once. The top team in each group progresses to the semi-finals.

Results

Group A

Group B

Group C

Group D

Finals

See also
 2014 Dr McKenna Cup

References

External links
Results

O'Byrne Cup
O'Byrne Cup